Chan Sarun  (also known as Ngor Hong Srun; , ; born 18 March 1948) is the former Cambodian Minister of Agriculture, Forestry and Fisheries. He belongs to the Cambodian People's Party and was elected to represent Takeo Province in the National Assembly of Cambodia in 2003. The younger brother of the late Cambodian-American actor Haing S. Ngor, and also the brother-in-law of the late Chang My-Huoy, Chan is the son of an ethnic Chinese father and a Khmer mother, with ancestry from the Hakka of Meizhou.

References

1948 births
Cambodian people of Chinese descent
Members of the National Assembly (Cambodia)
Living people
Cambodian People's Party politicians
Government ministers of Cambodia